Duncan Campbell Ross (December 16, 1871 – January 10, 1961) was a Canadian lawyer and Liberal politician. He sat in the Legislative Assembly of Ontario representing Middlesex West from 1907 to 1908 and Middlesex North from 1908 to 1909.

He represented Middlesex West in the House of Commons from 1909 to 1921. During the Conscription Crisis of 1917, Ross remained loyal to the anti-conscription (and largely francophone) Laurier Liberals, and was one of only 8 members of the faction to be elected from Ontario in that year's election.

He is the son of Sir George William Ross who was Premier of Ontario from 1899 to 1905.

External links
 
 
 

1871 births
1961 deaths
Laurier Liberals
Lawyers in Ontario
Liberal Party of Canada MPs
Members of the House of Commons of Canada from Ontario
Ontario Liberal Party MPPs